Vučjak is a Serbo-Croatian toponym, derived from vuk (wolf), also meaning "shepherd dog". It may refer to:

 Kamenski Vučjak, a village in Croatia
 Čečavački Vučjak, a village near Brestovac, Croatia
 Vučjak Feričanački, a village near Feričanci, Croatia
 Vučjak (mountain, northern Bosnia), a mountain in Bosnia and Herzegovina
 Vučjak (mountain, western Bosnia), a mountain in Bosnia and Herzegovina
 Vučjak, a peak of Velebit, Croatia

See also
Wolves of Vučjak, Serb paramilitary

Serbo-Croatian place names